Jeppe Bøje Nielsen (born 7 March 1974) is a former freestyle swimmer from Denmark, who competed for his native country at the 2000 Summer Olympics in Sydney, Australia.

References
Profile

1974 births
Living people
Danish male freestyle swimmers
Swimmers at the 2000 Summer Olympics
Olympic swimmers of Denmark